The Ormond Steamer automobile was made by the United Motor and Vehicle Company of Boston, Massachusetts from 1904 to 1905.

They are not to be confused with the 1903 Ormond Motor Car Company of Brooklyn, New York which did not produce any cars.

History 
The Ormond Steamer used a 24-hp steam-engine with a flash boiler. Built as a large touring car with a canopy top, the company exhibited at the 1905 New York Automobile show. An estimated three to four cars were built under this marque.

References

Defunct companies based in Massachusetts
Motor vehicle manufacturers based in Massachusetts
Defunct motor vehicle manufacturers of the United States

Steam vehicles
1900s cars
Brass Era vehicles
Vehicle manufacturing companies established in 1904
Vehicle manufacturing companies disestablished in 1905
Cars introduced in 1904